Artur Silva de Pomoceno (born 1 May 1997) is a Brazilian badminton player.

Career 
Pomoceno started playing badminton in 2008 for the Rio de Janeiro social project. In 2013, he won the South America Badminton Championships, and in 2014 he was a runner-up. In 2014, he also won the bronze medal at the Pan Am Junior Badminton Championships in the boys' singles event, and in 2015 he won the silver medal. In 2016, he won the silver medal at the Pan Am Badminton Championships in the men's singles event. At the 2018 South American Games, Pomoceno claimed four medals, 2 golds in the men's doubles and team event; and 2 silvers in the men's singles and mixed doubles event.

Achievements

Pan Am Championships 
Men's singles

South American Games 
Men's singles

Men's doubles

Mixed doubles

Pan Am Junior Championships 
Boys' singles

BWF International Challenge/Series (5 titles, 5 runners-up) 
Men's singles

Men's doubles

Mixed doubles

  BWF International Challenge tournament
  BWF International Series tournament
  BWF Future Series tournament

References

External links 
 

Living people
1997 births
Sportspeople from Rio de Janeiro (city)
Brazilian male badminton players
Badminton players at the 2019 Pan American Games
Pan American Games competitors for Brazil
South American Games gold medalists for Brazil
South American Games silver medalists for Brazil
South American Games medalists in badminton
Competitors at the 2018 South American Games
21st-century Brazilian people